Portugal participated at the 2015 European Games in Baku, Azerbaijan, from 12 to 28 June 2015, with a delegation of 100 athletes that competed in 14 sports.

On 10 April 2015, the Olympic Committee of Portugal (COP) announced that the country had secured 99 athlete quota places in 13 sports, with the possibility of increasing this number by the deadline for inscription of athletes (30 April 2015). On 12 May 2015, COP announced a list of 101 athletes competing in 14 sports, following a reallocation of badminton quota places. On 4 June 2015, a final list of 100 athletes was announced, with the exclusion of female wrestler Ana Pereira due to failure in complying with the national federation selection criteria. In addition, two injury-related changes were made: female gymnast Zoi Lima and male table tennis player João Monteiro were substituted by Mariana Pitrez and João Geraldo. On the opening day of the Games, clinical issues forced four last-minute athlete changes: female swimmer Tamila Holub (appendicitis) was replaced by Madalena Azevedo, while the acrobatic gymnastics female trio was replaced due to injury of one of its members (Raquel Martins) by Jéssica Correia, Joana Patrocínio and Susana Pinto.

The delegation will include a staff of 59 people, among which 45 officials, and will be headed by former Olympic canoer José Garcia, who will also lead the Olympic mission to the 2016 Summer Olympics. Four-time Olympic shooter João Costa was chosen to be the flagbearer at the opening ceremony, while multiple world and European medal-winning judoka Telma Monteiro will carry the flag at the closing ceremony.

Medal summary

Badminton

Portugal qualified three athletes in three events, based on the ranking list released by the Badminton World Federation on 26 March 2015. The competition took place at the Baku Sports Hall from 22 to 28 June. None of the participating athletes were able to advance from the group play stage, with Sónia Gonçalves securing the only Portuguese win in this competition.

Beach soccer

Portugal qualified a team of 12 players based on the results at the 2014 Euro Beach Soccer League. The competition took place at the Beach Arena from 24 to 28 June.

The Portuguese team finished at the top of Group A, ahead of Switzerland, after winning all of its matches. As a result, they advanced to the semi-finals, where they suffered a 2–1 defeat against Group B runners-up and world champions Russia. Having beaten Switzerland 6–5 in the group stage, Portugal repeated the scoreline in the bronze medal match to secure the tenth and last Portuguese medal at these Games.

Squad
Coach:  Mário Narciso

 

Source: Baku 2015 European Games

Group stage
Group A

Semi-finals

Bronze medal match

Canoe sprint

Portugal qualified thirteen athletes in eleven events, based on the results at the 2014 Canoe Sprint European Championships. The competition took place at the Kur Sport and Rowing Centre in Mingachevir from 14 to 16 June.

Portuguese boats qualified for eight finals (seven finals A and one final B). The best results came through Olympic silver medalist Fernando Pimenta, who won two silver medals, after finishing behind Germany's Max Hoff in the men's K1 1000 and 5000 metres events. Pimenta was the only Portuguese athlete to win more than one medal at these Games.

Men

Women

Cycling

Portugal qualified nine athletes in six events, based on the national ranking list released by the Union Cycliste Internationale on 31 December 2014. The competition took place from 16 to 27 June in several courses and venues across Baku. Mountain biker David Rosa was the only Portuguese athlete to reach a top-ten placing, by finishing exactly in the 10th place in the men's cross-country event.

Road cycling
The road race course consisted of multiple laps in an urban circuit starting and finishing at the Freedom Square.

Mountain biking
The mountain biking events took place on 13 June at the Mountain Bike Velopark.

BMX
The BMX events took place at the BMX Velopark on 26 and 28 June.

Gymnastics

Acrobatic
Portugal qualified five athletes in three events, based on the results at the 2014 Acrobatic Gymnastics World Championships.

Aerobic
Portugal qualified a pair of athletes in one event, based on the results at the 2013 Aerobic Gymnastics European Championships.

Artistic
Portugal qualified four athletes in eleven events, based on the results at the 2014 European Men's Artistic Gymnastics Championships and 2014 European Women's Artistic Gymnastics Championships.

Men

Women

Trampoline
Portugal qualified four athletes in four events, based on the results at the 2014 European Trampoline Championships.

Judo

Portugal qualified 14 athletes in 12 events, based on the International Judo Federation world ranking list announced on 2 March 2015.

Men

Women

Karate

Portugal qualified one athlete, based on the results at the 2015 European Karate Championships.

Shooting

Portugal qualified four athletes in six events, based on the rankings announced by the European Shooting Confederation.

Swimming

Portugal has qualified for nine individual quota places, based on a ranking list announced by the Ligue Européenne de Natation, accounting the results per NOC from the past three European Junior Swimming Championships.

Table tennis

Portugal qualified two teams of three players (one team per gender) based on the results at the 2014 European Table Tennis Championships. Two players from each team also competed in the respective singles event.

Taekwondo

Portugal qualified four athletes, based on the Olympic Ranking list announced by the World Taekwondo Federation on 31 March 2015.

Triathlon

Portugal qualified five athletes in two events, based on the European Triathlon Union 2014 Points List rankings on 31 December 2014.

Wrestling

Portugal qualified five athletes, based on the results at the 2014 European Wrestling Championships.

Freestyle

Greco-Roman

References

Nations at the 2015 European Games
European Games
2015